The 1985 NCAA Division I men's lacrosse tournament was the 15th annual Division I NCAA Men's Lacrosse Championship tournament. Twelve NCAA Division I college men's lacrosse teams met after having played their way through a regular season, and for some, a conference tournament.

Summary 

The championship game was hosted by Brown University and was played in front of 14,455 fans.

The game saw Johns Hopkins University and Syracuse University meeting in the finals for a third straight year and winning by a score of 11–4. Johns Hopkins finished the season with 13 wins and one loss, the lone loss being to 13th ranked North Carolina 11-10. This was Don Zimmerman's second straight national title as head coach.

As in 1984, Larry Quinn was named Tournament Outstanding Player. Quinn and the Hopkins' defense gave up only 21 goals over this three game tournament. Hopkins' defense allowed only one goal to Syracuse for the final three plus quarters. In the regular season Hopkins did lose one close game to UNC, but their defense kept opposing teams under 10 goals in 12 of their 14 games including an early season 8-6 win over Syracuse.

This finals was notable also for being Hopkin's ninth straight appearance in the title game. The Blue Jays had five victories with four defeats in title games during this nine-year period. Hopkins would return to the NCAA finals in 1987.

Bracket 

(i) one overtime

Box scores

Finals

Semifinals

Quarterfinals

Outstanding players
Larry Quinn, Johns Hopkins (Named Tournament's Most Outstanding Player)

See also
1985 NCAA Division I Women's Lacrosse Championship
1985 NCAA Division III Men's Lacrosse Championship

References 

NCAA Division I Men's Lacrosse Championship
NCAA Division I Men's Lacrosse Championship
NCAA Division I Men's Lacrosse Championship
NCAA Division I Men's Lacrosse Championship
NCAA Division I Men's Lacrosse Championship
NCAA Division I Men's Lacrosse Championship